Santaji Mahaloji Ghorpade,(1645–1696) popularly known as ‘Santajirao’ or ‘Santaji Ghorpade’, was the most celebrated Maratha warrior and the sixth Sarsenapati of the Maratha Empire during Rajaram's regime. His name became inseparable from the name of Dhanaji Jadhav with whom he made campaigns against Mughal Army continuously from 1689 to 1696. He is considered to be one of the most foremost exponents of ganimi kava (Guerilla warfare).

Early life

Santaji belonged to the historical Ghorpade family which is a senior branch of the Bhosale clan. Ghorpades were originally called Bhosales. His year of birth is not known, however, it is estimated to be circa 1660. 

Santaji was the eldest of the three sons of Sarsenapati Mhaloji Ghorpade of Kapshi, who was the Sarsenapati (Commander-In-Chief) of the armies of Chhatrapati Sambhaji Maharaj for a short term after the death of Sarsenapati Hambirrao Mohite. He had two younger brothers named Bahirji and Maloji. His father was step brother of Baji Ghorpade, who was killed by Chhatrapati Shivaji Maharaj, as some sources claim Baji contrived along with Afzal Khan in imprisoning and humiliating Shahji Raje Bhosale (Shivaji's father) in the Adilshah court. Santaji rose through the ranks under the guidance of Hambirrao Mohite. 

Santaji and his younger brother Bahirji accompanied Shivaji in his campaign of Jalna in 1679. Santaji later on became an important Sardar during Chhatrapati Sambhaji's reign. Sambhaji had sent him and senior Sardar Keshav Pingale with an army of 12,000 to bring food supplies from the Jinji region in 1686. Santaji was with his father in 1689 when Sambhaji was being captured, while Mhaloji refused to leave Sambhaji being his Senapati and died protecting his king in Sangameshwar.  Santaji was asked to leave ahead as Sambhaji Maharaj planned to distract invading Mughal forces and escape. After Mhaloji's untimely and unceremonious death, his sons and brothers remained loyal to Chhatrapati Rajaram I and Maharani Tarabai, further helping the Maratha cause of Swaraj.

Role in Maratha-Mughal War

In the beginning of the Rajaram's regime in 1689, Santaji had attained the rank of Pancha Hajari officer i.e. commander of 5,000 soldiers.

In September 1689, along with Dhanaji, Santaji attacked Aurangzeb's General Sheikh Nizam who had placed a siege around the fort of Panhala. Nizam's army was severely beaten and his treasure, horses and elephants were captured. Then during 1689–1690 period, Santaji and Dhanaji were directed to prevent Mughal army in Maharashtra from chasing and entering Karnataka after Rajaram's flight to Jinji. They succeeded in this task and were able to slow down and engage the Mughals in harassing skirmishes. In December 1690, Santaji and Dhanaji were promoted as leading Maratha generals, and were placed respectively under the supervision of Ramchandra Pant Amatya and Shankraji Narayan Sacheev.

On 25 May 1690, Sarzakhan alias Rustamkhan, a Mughal nobleman and commander, was soundly defeated and captured near Satara jointly by Ramchandra Pant Amatya, Shankraji Narayan, Santaji and Dhanaji and this proved to be a major setback to emperor Aurangzeb. In July 1692, for his great victory, Rajaram rewarded him with the Deshmukhi (fiefdom) of Miraj.

In the last quarter of 1692, Santaji and Dhanaji were sent south to alleviate the Mughal pressure on Jinjee. And on the way there they managed to capture Dharwad on 8 October 1692, Dharwad with an army consisting of 7000 Maratha foot soldiers under the duo's command.

On 14 December 1692, Santaji defeated Aurangzeb's General Ali Mardan Khan, captured him and brought him back to fort Jinjee. In December 1692, the Mughal army under Zulfikhar Ali Khan around fort Jinjee was blocked and beaten by Santaji and Dhanaji as a result of which Zulfikar Khan had to sue King Rajaram for peace and was forced to compromise. Then on 5 January 1693, Santaji attacked the Mughal camp at Desur and looted their treasure, weapons and livestock.

Santaji was praised for his bravery by Queen Tarabai as he attacked Aurangzeb's camp and sacked it completely. Maratha troops thought that Aurangzeb died in this attack, but Aurangzeb escaped by spending night with his daughter in a Tent. A drama 'Bhangale Swapn Maharashtra' written by Bashir Momin Kavathekar depicts the thrill and adventures raid on Aurangzeb's camp at Tulapur and also brings out how stringently the guidlines laid down by Shivaji Maharaj were being followed by maratha soldiers (which spared Aurngajeb's life because he was offering religious prayers).

Attacking Aurangzeb's camp was really hard task, but Santaji's motivational speech gave Maratha troops will to do so, Santaji told that-

we are the warriors who attacked Shaista Khan's camp which was filled up with lakh of soldiers and our Shiv Chatrapati had cut his fingers. The same condition will be done now let's unite and attack Aurang's camp and destroy it, He also told that {आपण सगळे औरंग ची गर्दन मारूया} which means Let's all kill Aurangzeb

On 14 November 1693, Mughal General Himmat Khan beat back Santaji near Vikramhalli in Karnataka. Soon thereafter, Santaji regrouped his troops and reengaged Himmat Khan again on 21 November 1693 and avenged his earlier defeat.

In July 1695, Santaji trapped the Mughal army camping near Khatav and harassed it with Blitzkrieg. Italian visitor to the Mughal court, Minnucci, has listed details of the lightning-fast and devastating Maratha attacks on the Mughal camps. High level of tension, stress and apprehension among the troops and camp followers, about the ever-present Maratha threat were recorded. On 20 November 1695, Kasim Khan, Aurangzeb's powerful General in Karnataka, was attacked, defeated and killed by Santaji at Doderi near Chitradurga.

In December 1695, Dhanaji was defeated in a battle near Vellore by Zulfiquar Khan. On 20 January 1696 near Baswapattan, Santaji attacked, defeated and personally killed the Mughal General Himmat Khan. On 26 February 1696, Mughal General Hamid-uddin Khan defeated Santaji in a brief tussle. In April 1696, Santaji was also defeated by Zulfikhar Khan at Arani in Karnataka.

In 1693, after lengthy negotiations with Rajaram, Zulfiquar Khan was granted a safe passage out which Santaji did not approve. Santaji had bravely defeated and captured Zuliquar Khan. It is a widely known fact that Zulfiquar Khan deliberately delayed the capture of Jingee going along with his father Asad Khan's plan to carve a territory for himself, similar to, now defunct, Adilshah and Qutubshah states in the South. They hoped and expected octogenarian Aurangzeb would die soon either due to old age or overthrown by his impatient sons for the Delhi throne. Thus, the succession chaos at the Mogul court will ensue to provide them with the opportunity to annex the southern territory, especially Golconda in Hyderabad.

Rajaram was aware of Zulfiquar's ambitions and colluded with the Khan against Aurangzeb, probably for the sake of politics, survival and safety of future. Later in 1699, Zulfiquar also provided safe passage to Rajaram's wives unmolested when he captured Jinjee, with Rajaram already escaped. The Khan and Rajaram had understanding to benefit each other for politics or previous gratitudes. This was similar to Shahji and Radullah, later by their sons, Shivaji and Rustam, providing each other with intel of their courts. The politics then was very complex and everchanging, those acted without personal vendettas survived and were clear in their foresightedness.  Zulfiquar Khan also escorted Sambhaji's family respectfully and unmolested to Aurangzeb after he captured Raigad. He also was very protective and great well wisher of Shahu's (Sambhaji's son in captivity) in Aurangzeb's campaign, probably hoped for the Maratha help for his own ambitions. Zulfiquar's mother was Shaista Khan's sister and he himself married to the Khan's daughter. Shaista khan who was maternal uncle of Aurangzeb, lost his three fingers and pride at the hands of Shivaji, Rajaram's father, in the most famous surprise attack in Pune in 1663.

Santaji as much known to be great and intrepid in guerrilla warfare tactics did not seem shrewd in understanding the manipulation of politics and diplomacy behind curtains, and misunderstood his King and the final Maratha cause on many occasions leading to rift between him and Rajaram.

On 8 May 1696, Santaji met Rajaram at fort Jinjee, argued with him on certain issues, some sources suggest he demanded rewards for his services, and left Jingee without resolving their differences. Santaji didn't exactly have a suave tongue like Dhanaji Jadhav and dealt much action with confrontation, bravado and brutal rage, While meeting Rajaram, he argued and very disrespectfully said, "The Chatrapatti exist because of me and I can make and dethrone Chatrapattis at will". He probably realised later in the fit of anger he has sealed his fate and left the place without Rajaram's permission. Dhanaji was made the new Sarnaubat(Master of Cavalry), which further enraged Santaji. Muni lal is of opinion that Santaji was not patriotic for the maratha state and was arrogant.

Rajaram, then did not have wise counsel of Praladji Pant, his Pratinidi (top minister), who had died. Praladji proved great talent in previously handling conflicting personalities like Santaji during the start of Maratha resurrection after Sambhaji's death. Rajaram, therefore, couldn't deal such a disrespectful provocation without reprimand in order to maintain discipline in Maratha ranks. Even though these were unpardonable provocations during Rajaram's predecessor's time or even according to Santaji's own military standards. The arrest orders were issued by the King to discipline the great warrior to avoid further mischief, but Rajaram would not have wanted him assassinated as some popular sources later suggest wrongly. Santaji was already chased by his enemies in both camps, Marathas and Moguls.

In June 1696, by order of Rajaram, Dhanaji attacked Santaji for his rebellion near Vriddhachalam but had to turn back.  In March 1697, Dhanaji defeated Santaji at Dahigaon with the help of Hanmantrao Nimbalkar.

Jadunath Sarkar, a renowned historian on Maratha history, provides a great insight in his book, House of Shivaji, about the heroics and fall of Santaji Ghorpade. Khafi Khan writes,"Shanta used to inflict severe punishments on his followers. For the slightest fault he would cause the offender to be trampled to death under an elephant." The man who insists on efficiency and discipline in a trophical country makes himself universally unpopular, and, therefore, we are not surprised when we learn from Khafi Khan that " Most of Maratha Nobles became Shanta's enemies and made a secret agreement with his rival Dhanaji Jadhav to destroy him."

In May 1696, Dhanaji attacked Santaji but Santaji was victorious and was able to capture one of Dhanaji's key member, Amritrao Nimbalkar. Santaji later trampled him to death under an elephant. Amritrao's sister, Radhabai, was married to Nagoji Mane of Mhaswad, who then worked for Moguls. The loving sister demanded her husband to avenge the death of her brother.

In Masir-i-Alamgiri, Aurangzeb's biography, depicts an account of Santaji, "On the way to Jingee, this wretch had a fight with Dhana Jadhav, who was escorting Rajaram there, on account of an old quarrel. Shanta triumphed, and caused Amritrao, the brother-in-law of Nagoji, comrade and assistant of Dhana, to be crushed under an elephant. He also captured Rajaram but Dhana escaped. The next day Shanta appeared before Rajaram with his wrists bound together, pleading," I am the same loyal servant(as before). My rudeness was due to this that you wanted to make Dhana my equal and reach Jingi with his help. I shall now do whatever you bid me." Then he released Rajaram and conducted Rajaram to Jinjee.

Another cause of Satanji's attitude of aloofness from the government was his being drawn into the cross-currents of ministerial rivalry of the western capital of Maharashtra. He sided with Parshuram the rival of Ramchandra Pant, otherwise known as Amatya.
Dhana Jadhav was preferred by Rajaram and Ramchandra Pant, latter was more of regeant to Rajaram and conducted all his affairs in Maratha resurrection after the death of Sambhaji. Dhana was also well praised in Mogul records and preferred in any negotiations arose between Marathas and Mogul Chieftains. Dhana was the great-grandson of Jijabai's brother. Jijabai was also the grandmother of Rajaram. Santaji was possibly the grandson of Baji Ghorpade, who arrested and humiliated the grandfather of Rajaram, Shahji in Adilshah court in 1648. This, however, unlikely had any bearing on the strained relations between two factions. Shahji Raje helped many of his Maratha relatives rise to power, and Ghorpades also benefitted greatly from his benevolence.

Death

An imperial order from emperor Aurangzeb to pursue Santaji was given to Hamiddudin Khan Bahadur. Khan fought with him and recovered some of the elephants of Qasim Khan, which Santaji had looted earlier. Then Khan was ordered to return to the court, leaving some of his officers to accompany Bidar Bakht, who had been ordered to chase Santaji. Several fights occurred, however Santaji's plunder against Mughal camps stiil continued.

On the way to Jinji, Santaji had a fight with Dhanaji Jadhav, who was conveying Rajaram to Jinji, on account of an old quarrel. Santaji triumphed, and captured Amrit Rao, brother-in-law of Nagoji, had him trampled down by an elephant. Santaji also captured Rajaram, but Dhanaji escaped. The next day Santaji tied his hands and apologised Rajaram for his rudeness. Then he conducted Rajaram to Jinji. Zulfiqar Khan Bahadur was ordered to besiege the fort. The fort was captured but Santaji escaped with Rajaram and went towards Satara to fight with Dhanaji, who was there. In this battle, Dhanaji triumphed. Mane Brothers and Dhanaji decided to abuct Santaji. But, Santaji fled from the field with only a few men to the zammdari of Nagoji, with whom he sought refuge. Nagoji gave him shelter in his house, but his wife, whose brother had been killed by Santaji, urged her husband and another brother not to let Santaji go away alive. Nagoji dismissed, but his wife's brother went in pursuit, seeking for an opportunity to kill Santaji. By this time, Aurangzeb issued an imperial order to Ghaziuddin khan Feroz Jung to pursue Santaji. The troops of Bidar Bhakt and Hamiddudin Khan were placed under his command. Mane  and Dhanaji were trying to subjugate Santaji and all his members back to the Maratha Empire by forgetting all the past fights they had. As, Santaji was not ready to do so. Mane with His Brother in law decided to execute Santaji.

At the time Santaji was bathing in a dense forest near karkhel in Maharashtra. Two forces emerged and tried  and one of them killed him on finding him alone. Santaji was killed either by Ghaziuddin Khan's forces or was killed by Mane's brother-in-law. At last, his head was sent to the Emperor by Ghaziuddin Khan.

Legacy

His eldest son became a general and he died in a battle in 1701. Santaji's son Yeshoji & Tukoji continued his military activities by shifting their base to Sandur near Bellary & Guti in Karnataka.With help of Telangi-Berads, they sided with Tarabai faction of Kolhapur during Maratha war of succession fought between Shahu & Tarabai. After the Peshwa of Pune obtained additional powers in 1749, Ghorpades concentrated their activities in Karnataka.

Murarrao Ghorpade, a grandnephew of Santaji, made an alliance with Muhammad Ali and helped him to defeat Chanda Sahib in famous Battle of Arcot fought in 1751. This battle is known in history of British East India Company as part of the Carnatic Wars fought between Robert Clive led forces of British East India Company and Dupleix led French East India Company between 1751 and 1758, also known as 7 years war. English historians tend to highlight & threat from Nizam of Hyderabad-Hyder Ali-Tipu Sultan kept them engrossed in Karnataka-Tamil Nadu away from politics of Pune Darbars. Ghorpades maintained working relationship with British East India Company in their Karnataka-Tamil Nadu operations maturing from the cordial relationship established with Robert Clive during siege of Arcot in 1751. Descendants of Santaji still live in (Sidhojirao Bahirjee branch) Sandur & Guti, Karnataka. His descendants are also part of the families of Mudhol, Bedag Thane, Madhabhavi Thane, Khemlapur Thane, of state Datwadd, Bahadurwadi, Satave, Bhadale, Ashta, Khanapur, Nandgao in Satara, Kolhapur and Sangli districts of Maharashtra. One branch of descendants of Rajeghorpade continued to serve under Kolhapur Princely State of Bhosale. Ramchandra Babaji Ghorpade of this branch held feudal estate near Satave of Panhala. Later after independence of India his grandson Nivruti Vithoji Ghorpade co-founded Warana Sugar and allied industries. He remained Vice-chairman/ Director of Warana industries for 35 years.

Jadunath Sarkar the noted historian writes in his famous book namely military history of India about Santaji:

Citations

References
'Marathi Riyasat Volume II' (Marathi) by Govind Sakharam Sardesai
'Marathyanche Svatantra Yuddha' (Marathi) by Setu Madhavrao Pagadi
'Aurangzeb' (English) by Sir Jadunath Sarkar
 Book by Mahesh Tendulkar at Sahyadri books
 https://web.archive.org/web/20120622164358/http://www.pethvadgaon.com/

Indian military leaders
People of the Maratha Empire
1697 deaths
1660 births